Ada pradhaman is a traditional Keralan dessert made by using the rice ada (rice pasta or flakes) with a sauce of cooked coconut milk and jaggery. Ada pradhaman is specially prepared in every home of kerala on the festival day of Onam,it is one of the major element of Sadya. A variety of payasam, ada pradhaman is known as the King of Payasam.

Typical preparation
Cooked rice ada is added to milk or coconut milk, then topped with a jaggery syrup and other ingredients such as nuts, raisins, and cardamom.

The dish is usually served hot. It is one of the most common desserts in Kerala.

Palada Pradhaman
Palada Pradhaman is a type of Pradhaman made  with Pal(milk), rice ada, sugar, cardamom powder, nuts and raisins.

See also
Chakka prathaman

References

Indian desserts
Fruit dishes
Puddings
Kerala cuisine